Mount William is a national park, mountain, and locality in Tasmania (Australia), 234 km northeast of Hobart. Established in 1973 as an 8,640 hectares large national park, it has been expanded multiple times, reaching 13,806 ha in 1980 and 18,439 ha in 1999. The park is named after a hill that is 216m above sea level. In 2016, the official name of the mountain (but not the park) was changed to wukalina / Mount William.

Flora and fauna
The park provides protected habitat to eastern grey kangarooes, wombats, Bennetts wallabies, Tasmanian pademelons, echidnas, brush-tailed possums and Tasmanian devils.

See also
 Protected areas of Tasmania

References

National parks of Tasmania
East Coast Tasmania
Protected areas established in 1973
1973 establishments in Australia